Carnivorous Erection is the second full-length album by goregrind band Regurgitate. It was released on 20 October 2000 by Relapse Records. The picture LP version was released in 2001 by Morbid Records. The album cover was named the worst album cover of all time by the staff of Pitchfork Media and was named one of 50 "most controversial and hard rock album covers" by Loudwire.

Track listing 
 "The Pulsating Feast" - 1:37
 "Domination Through Mutilation" - 0:54
 "Escort Service of the Dead" - 1:06
 "Obscene Body Slayings" - 0:35
 "Fecal Freak" - 1:58
 "Humiliated in Your Own Blood" - 0:18
 "Just Another Stillborn" - 0:44
 "Parade of the Decapitated Midgets" - 1:04
 "Ruptured Remains in a Doggybag" - 0:33
 "Copious Head Carnage" - 1:03
 "Carnivorous Erection" - 1:29
 "Relentless Pursuit of Rotting Flesh" - 0:35
 "Swallow the Human Filth" - 1:05
 "Dismantle the Afterbirth" - 0:38
 "Choked in Shit" - 0:55
 "Funeral Genocide" - 0:13
 "Rancid Head of Splatter" - 1:23
 "Rage Against Humanity" - 0:56
 "To Boil a Corpse" - 0:45
 "Bloody Pile of Human Waste" - 0:48
 "Drenched in Cattleblood" - 1:06
 "Carbonated Death" - 1:04
 "Skull of Shit and Sludge" - 0:40
 "Desperate Need for Violation" - 0:21
 "37 Stabwounds" - 0:24
 "Vomified (Regurgitated to the Core)" - 1:00
 "Headless She Died" - 0:33
 "Breath Like Rotten Meat" - 1:01
 "I Wanna Kill" - 0:45
 "Claw-Hammer Castration" - 1:00
 "Festering Embryonic Vomit" - 0:39
 "Smeared with Bloodmixed Semen" - 0:40
 "You're About to Fuckin' Die" - 0:21
 "Stinking Genital Warts" - 0:24
 "Pyronecrobestiality" - 1:35
 "Self-Disembowelment" - 0:34
 "Savage Gorewhore" - 0:35
 "The Combustion and Consumption of Pyorrheic Waste" - 1:27

Personnel
 Rikard Jansson – vocals
 Urban Skytt – guitar and bass
 Jocke Pettersson – drums

References

2000 albums
Regurgitate (band) albums
Albums with cover art by Wes Benscoter